Fresnal Canyon is a canyon in the Baboquivari Mountains in Pima County, Arizona. This locale has been a notable place for the archaeological recovery of pre-ceramic Native American habitation. This canyon has a number of native flora and fauna, including the elephant tree (Bursera fagaroides). The canyon is within the Tohono O'odham Nation lands.

Line notes

References 
 Vorsila L. Bohrer. 2007. Preceramic subsistence in two rock shelters in Fresnal Canyon, page 12

Landforms of Pima County, Arizona
Canyons and gorges of Arizona
Tohono O'odham Nation